is a Japanese composer and bassist. He has been playing music with a band since high school, and has also been involved in music and sound activities for theater companies before joining Sega in 1999. He is mainly in charge of music for the Sonic the Hedgehog series of video games, beginning with Sonic Adventure 2 (2001).

Works
All works listed below were composed by Ohtani unless otherwise noted.

References

External links
 

1974 births
Japanese composers
Japanese bass guitarists
Japanese male composers
Living people
Musicians from Tokyo
Sega people
Sonic the Hedgehog
Video game composers
Male bass guitarists
21st-century bass guitarists